Čapkovič is Slovak surname of:
 Ján Čapkovič (born 1948, Bratislava), a Slovak football player
 Jozef Čapkovič (born 1948, Bratislava), a Slovak football player
 Kamil Čapkovič (born 1986, Michalovce), a Slovak tennis player

Slovak-language surnames